The 1986 season was São Paulo's 57th season since club's existence.

Statistics

Scorers

Managers performance

Overall 
{|class="wikitable"
|-
|Games played || 80 (38 Campeonato Paulista, 34 Campeonato Brasileiro, 8 Friendly match)
|-
|Games won || 30 (11 Campeonato Paulista, 17 Campeonato Brasileiro, 2 Friendly match)
|-
|Games drawn || 38 (20 Campeonato Paulista, 13 Campeonato Brasileiro, 5 Friendly match)
|-
|Games lost || 12 (7 Campeonato Paulista, 4 Campeonato Brasileiro, 1 Friendly match)
|-
|Goals scored || 120
|-
|Goals conceded || 64
|-
|Goal difference || +56
|-
|Best result || 6–1 (H) v Ponte Preta - Campeonato Brasileiro - 1986.12.10
|-
|Worst result || 1–4 (A) v Juventus - Campeonato Paulista - 1986.4.16
|-
|Top scorer || Careca (33)
|-

Friendlies

Taça dos Campeões Rio-São Paulo

Trofeo Teresa Herrera

Official competitions

Campeonato Paulista

First stage

Matches

Second stage

Matches

Record

Campeonato Brasileiro

First round

Matches

Second stage

Eightfinals

Quarterfinals

Semifinals

Final

Record

External links
official website 

1986
1986 in Brazilian football